Le Conte du ventre plein (international English title: Bellyful) is a 2000 film written and directed by Melvin Van Peebles.

Plot 

A conservative couple masquerade as liberal do-gooders in late 60's France. With orders piling up at their bistro, The Full Belly, Loretta and Henri, self-described "pillars of the community," hire Diamantine as a waitress in order to give a poor black orphan a chance at a better life. At home, they tell their trusting, new live-in employee that she's "one of the family," yet in town they encourage widespread disapproval of her. When they convince her to carry an extended joke to full term - pretending she's pregnant - Diamantine, and a slightly shady friend of the couple, Jan, become entangled in an elaborate charade.

External links
 
 

2000 films
2000s screwball comedy films
American satirical films
American screwball comedy films
Camcorder films
2000s English-language films
2000s French-language films
Films directed by Melvin Van Peebles
American independent films
French independent films
2000 independent films
2000s American films
2000s French films